Stephen John Rouse (born January 20, 1949 in Glamorgan) is a former Welsh first-class cricketer for Warwickshire. A left-arm pace bowler, Rouse took 270 wickets at 30.78 in his 127 game career.

Rouse is now the groundsman at Edgbaston although he announced in June 2011 he intended to retire from that position at the end of the current English season.

References

 

1949 births
Living people
Welsh cricketers
Warwickshire cricketers
D. H. Robins' XI cricketers
Sportspeople from Merthyr Tydfil